A Continuous Certificate of Discharge or Continuous Discharge Certificate (C.D.C.) is a seafarer's identity document issued by his country. This document certifies that the person holding this is a seaman as per The International Convention on Standards of Training, Certification and Watch keeping for Seafarers (STCW), 1978, as amended 2010. The master of the vessel signs the document each time a seaman is signed off from the vessel certifying his experience on board.

A C.D.C. granted under STCW rules is valid for five years and may be renewed on expiration or within six months prior to date of expiration, on a request from the holder, for a further period up to five years at a time if the holder is a serving seaman and his C.D.C. has not been cancelled, withdrawn or suspended under these rules.
If the period of validity of  CDC of a seaman expires during the voyage, it is valid until the end of the voyage.

See also
Seaman Service Book
Merchant Mariner Credential
Merchant Mariner's Document

References

Merchant navy
Identity documents